Nimera is an ILRC and village in Phagi Tehsil in Jaipur district, Rajasthan.

Nimera has eight patwar circles - Keriya, Kishorpura, Nainasya, Nimera, Parwan, Lasariya, Sameliya and Hatheli. Nimera is also a revenue circle for nearby villages, Jagannathpura and Shri Ramganj.

Based on 2011 census, Nimera has 663 households with total population of 4,227 (52.24% males, 47.76% females). Total area of village is 21.04 km2.  There are 4 primary schools and one commercial bank in the village.

Villages in Nimera

References

Cities and towns in Jaipur district